Medusafissurella dubia is a species of sea snail, a marine gastropod mollusk in the family Fissurellidae, the keyhole limpets.

Description
The shell size varies between 16 mm and 36 mm

Distribution
This species is distributed in the Indian Ocean along Kenya, Madagascar and South Africa.

References

External links

 McLean J.H. & Kilburn R.N. 1986. Propodial elaboration in Southern African and Indian Ocean Fissurellidae (Mollusca: Prosobranchia) with descriptions of two new genera and one new species. Contributions in Science, Natural History Museum of Los Angeles County, 379: 1–12
 

Fissurellidae
Gastropods described in 1849